Ammonium arsenate is the inorganic compound with the formula (NH4)3AsO4. It is prepared by treating a concentrated solution of arsenic acid with ammonia, resulting in precipitation of colorless crystals of the trihydrate. Upon heating, it releases ammonia.

Like other compounds of arsenic, it is classified as an IARC Group 1 carcinogen, i.e. carcinogenic to humans.

Acid salts are also known, including diammonium arsenate and ammonium dihydrogen arsenate.

References

Ammonium compounds
Arsenates